Tantamayo (from Quechua Tanta Mayu) is one of eleven districts of the  Huamalíes Province in Peru.

Geography 
Other mountains are listed below:

Ethnic groups 
The people in the district are mainly indigenous citizens of Quechua descent. Quechua is the language which the majority of the population (72.93%) learnt to speak in childhood, 26.47% of the residents started speaking using the Spanish language (2007 Peru Census).

Archaeology 
Some of the most important archaeological sites of the district are Anku, Isuq, Phiruru, Susupillu and Wanqaran.

References